Pacific Alaska Airways was a subsidiary of Pan American World Airways that flew routes around Alaska. The airline was eventually completely absorbed into Pan Am in 1941.

History
Pacific Alaska Airways was established as ACA Aviation Corporation of the Americas in 1927, renamed to Pacific Alaska Airways in 1932 and the same year acquired  Alaskan Airways.  The first air mail services were commenced on 3 September 1933. On April 3, 1935, the airline flew the first air route from Juneau, Alaska to Fairbanks, Alaska. During this time period, the airline flew Lockheed Model 10 Electra and Fairchild aircraft. They also operated a radio station on Canyon Island during the 1930s. During their operation the airline purchased equipment and routes of a number of Alaskan operators.

See also 
 List of defunct airlines of the United States

References

Defunct airlines of the United States
Airlines established in 1932
Airlines disestablished in 1941
Airlines based in Alaska